Raymond P. Flynn (born 22 January 1957) is a retired middle-distance runner who works as a sports agent. Over the course of his racing career, Flynn ran a total of 89 sub-four minute miles, with his best time (and current Irish mile record) of 3:49.77 on 7 July 1982 in Oslo, Norway at the Bislett Games Dream Mile. He also held the Irish 1500 metres record for 41 years after running 3:33.5, in the same Oslo race.

Running career

Collegiate
While attending St Mel's College in Longford, Ireland, Flynn won the 1500 meters at the Great Britain Championships against other high school runners, after which he earned an athletic scholarship to East Tennessee State University. At ETSU, he was a member of the 1975 team that won the USA Track & Field Cross Country Championship, and was an NCAA All-American in both track and cross country, finishing only 0.08 seconds behind Steve Scott in the 1,500 meter final at the 1978 NCAA Track & Field Championships. He still holds the ETSU records for the 1500 meters and mile, both indoor and outdoor.

On 30 April 1977, Flynn ran his first sub-4 minute mile at the Penn Relays in a time of 3:59.4. In June of that year, he finished in last place in the men's 1500 meters finals of the NCAA DI Outdoor T&F Championships with a time of 3:42.90.

Post-collegiate
On 6 February 1981, Flynn finished in second place at the Wanamaker Mile in a time of 3:53.8. He had the lead in the last lap until he was passed by Eamonn Coghlan, who won in 3:53.0. In 1985, Flynn was a member of Ireland's four-man squad along with Marcus O'Sullivan, Eamonn Coghlan, and Frank O'Mara, which set a world record time of 15:49.08 in the 4 x mile relay, in a charity fund-raising race in Dublin. Flynn represented Ireland in the 1980 and 1984 Summer Olympic Games, where he was a finalist in the 5000 meters.

References

External links

1957 births
Living people
East Tennessee State University alumni
Athletes from the Republic of Ireland
Olympic athletes of Ireland
Athletes (track and field) at the 1980 Summer Olympics
Athletes (track and field) at the 1984 Summer Olympics
Irish male middle-distance runners
People educated at St Mel's College